Alexander Bannerman (1788–1864) was a British merchant and MP for Aberdeen.

Alexander Bannerman may also refer to:

Alexander Bannermann ( 1766), English engraver
Alick Bannerman (1854–1924), Australian cricketer
Sir Alexander Bannerman, 1st Baronet (died 1711), of the Bannerman baronets
Sir Alexander Bannerman, 2nd Baronet (died 1742), of the Bannerman baronets
Sir Alexander Bannerman, 3rd Baronet (died 1747), of the Bannerman baronets
Sir Alexander Bannerman, 4th Baronet (died 1770), of the Bannerman baronets
Sir Alexander Bannerman, 6th Baronet (1741–1813), of the Bannerman baronets
Sir Alexander Bannerman, 7th Baronet (1769–1840) of the Bannerman baronets
Sir Alexander Bannerman, 9th Baronet (1823–1877) of the Bannerman baronets
Sir Alexander Bannerman, 11th Baronet (1871–1934), British military aviator
Sir Alexander Bannerman, 14th Baronet (1933–1989) of the Bannerman baronets

See also